Elimia showalteri, common name the compact elimia, is a species of freshwater snail with an operculum, an aquatic gastropod mollusc in the family Pleuroceridae.

Shell description 
Elimia showalteri has a large, robust, smooth shell boldly colored brown and/or green shell.

Anatomy 
Elimia showalteri is agill-breathing snail. It is genetically very similar to the lacy elimia Elimia crenatella.

Distribution 
This snail lives in the United States.

Ecology

Habitat 
Compact elimia are found grazing individually throughout shoal habitats.

Life cycle 
Embryos develop into Trochophore larvae before eventually becoming Veliger larvae.

Feeding habits 
These snails are known to graze individually in Shoal habitats.

References 

showalteri